Jeff Devanney is an American football coach and former player.  He is currently the head football coach at Trinity College in Hartford, Connecticut, a position he has held since 2006.

Head coaching record

References

External links
 Trinity profile

Year of birth missing (living people)
Living people
Albany Great Danes football coaches
Central Connecticut Blue Devils football coaches
Coast Guard Bears football coaches
Georgia Tech Yellow Jackets football coaches
Trinity Bantams baseball players
Trinity Bantams football coaches
Trinity Bantams football players
University at Albany, SUNY alumni